Wang Chao may refer to:

 Places
 Wang Chao District, a district of Tak Province, Thailand

 People
 Wang Chao (Tang dynasty) (846–898), warlord in Fujian during the later years of the Tang dynasty
 Wang Chao (character), fictional Song dynasty officer under Bao Zheng
 Wang Chao (director) (born 1964), Chinese film director
 Wang Chao (figure skater) (born 1996), Chinese ice dancer
 Wang Chao (footballer) (born 1975), retired Chinese footballer
 Wang Chao (baseball) (born 1985), Chinese baseball player
 Wang Chao (sailor), Chinese sailor including in 2015 ISAF Sailing World Cup

See also
 Wang Chau (disambiguation)